The Abbey of St. James in Pegau was a Benedictine monastery in the town of Pegau in Saxony. It was one of the first monasteries founded in the Duchy of Saxony. It is known above all for the so-called Annales Pegaviensis, the Annals of Pegau from the year 1155, an important description of medieval history.

Benedictine monasteries in Germany
Leipzig (district)